En Thangai Kalyani is a 1988 Indian Tamil-language film directed and produced by T. Rajendar. Rajender himself appeared in the title role, with Sudha. The film featured Rajendar's real life children. It was released on 5 February 1988. Silambarasan won Best Child Artist award at the 10th Cinema Express Awards.

Plot 
Senthamarai deserts Srividhya and his two children, Rajendar & Sudha, to live with his concubine. He marries her and lives with her without taking care of his wife and children. Rajendar grows up with hatred of his father. He loves his sister Kalyani (Sudha) very much and buys everything for her. He sends her to college, but she falls in love with her co-student against the wishes of her brother and mother.

The guy to whom she was in love with is a fraud and does anything for money. Rajendar tries to warn Kalyani, but she elopes with him and marries him. Months later, Rajendar finds out that Kalyani is ill-treated by her husband, who is now living with a dancer. He is ready to do anything for the dancer.

Kalyani becomes pregnant and Srividhya meets her secretly without the knowledge of her son. Soon a son is born to Kalyani. Rajendar is very affectionate to his nephew, but he does not show it outside. But he does not speak to Kalyani and says he will never forgive her.

Senthamarai was ill-treated by his concubine, who is now his wife. She kept him alive only for his property. She sleeps with another person and Senthamarai finds out. He confronts her and she, with the help of her men, beats him and forces him to sign the stamp paper, thereby getting hold of all his property and kicks him out of the home.

He comes to visit Srividhya, who invites him with pleasure and provides him with food. When Rajendar finds about it, he became furious and asks him to leave. Srividhya, unwilling to let her husband go alone, leaves along with him.

Kalyani's husband's friend comes to her home and expresses his desire to sleep with her. She beats him with a broomstick. He in turn asks her husband to leave the dancer's home. But he agrees for his desire saying that living with the dancer means everything to him. He tricks Kalyani and takes her to his club where the men try to rape her.

Rajendar comes for her rescue. He manages to shoot one of them and spares her husband, but only to be shot by the dying guy whom he shot earlier. He dies and Kalyani also dies immediately.

Cast 

 T. Rajendar as Velu
 Srividya as Velu and Kalyani's Mother
 Vigdass as Kannan
 Sudha Swarnalakshmi as Kalyani
Senthamarai as Velu and Kalyani's Father
 S. S. Chandran as Meenatchi's Father
 Vennira Aadai Moorthy
Thyagu as Meenatchi's Brother
 Ganeshkar as Velu in Childhood
 Renuka
 Y. Vijaya
 Prameela
 Silambarasan as Kalyani's Son
 Thamizh Ilakkiya as Kalyani in Childhood
 Pasi Narayanan
 Oru Viral Krishna Rao
Usilai Mani
Vadivelu as Cyclist (Cameo Uncredited)

Soundtrack 
The soundtrack was written and composed by T. Rajendar.

References

External links 
 

1980s Tamil-language films
1988 films
Films directed by T. Rajendar
Films scored by T. Rajendar
Films with screenplays by T. Rajendar